= Korean Rangers Foundation =

The Korean Rangers Foundation is a membership foundation to support and promote park rangers and other wildlife stewards in Korea.

== History ==
The Korean Rangers Foundation (KRF) was founded in 2005 to draw together National Park Rangers from professionalism across South Korea, to develop a national identity as Korean Rangers and to provide support for new professionals. There are now approximately 1,000 Rangers working only for the public sector in South Korea.

Over 15% of National Park Rangers in South Korea are members of KRF. They come from all types of employment background from the Korean National Park Service and include members from associated professions such as the Forest Service (FS).

- The 1st KRF President: Beumhwoan Shin
- The 1st KRF Vice-president: Yongseok Shin

== Purpose ==
The Korean Rangers Foundation shares information, knowledge, and techniques from best practices on sites, the protected areas, as well as to enhance the stewardship and their own benefits among all national park employees as well as partners.
